Digha is a residential neighbourhood in Patna. The area is served by Digha PS under Patna Police. Digha is mostly known for the "Ghats" mean place near Ganga river. Digha is also known for Rnet Software's (software company located in Digha Bans Kothi), ITI college and WITI (Women's ITI) college. It comes under Digha (Vidhan Sabha constituency). There is a place called Digha Ghat Chauhatta and a colony named Haripur colony.
The JP Setu or Digha Rail-Road Bridge is started from Digha to Sonpur which connects Patna to Sonpur. This is the resident place of an international repute poet namely Tapeshwar Prasad Yadav. He has being selected as one of the awardees in the Category: *Poet of the Year* for the title: *Embers of My Dream* by ukiyoto Literary Awards 2022. Digha has now become the first destination for people who entered in Patna from other district of Bihar from Sonpur route.

History 
Digha, during the British Raj, was a village and agricultural area in Patna. Digha was famous for its mangoes orchards, moreover, famous Mango variety Digha Malda, which is popular in Bihar and even outside the state, got its name from it. In 1858, the Congregation of Christian Brothers established St. Michael's High School, Patna, the second oldest catholic institution in the city (now owned by the Jesuits). The school provided education to the children of Catholics, British expatriates and Anglo-Indians only. The major developments in the area took place after the 19th century, which helped spur high-density residential development in the locality. Digha was a forest(jungle). The second oldest Indian railway line was located at Digha, after the Bombay-Thane railway line.

Developments

It has developed into a crowded residential colony of Patna; marked by residential houses and high raise apartments. Its nearness to western Patna, development of Gola road which connects it to Bailey Road, AIIMS-Digha Elevated Corridor (Patli Path) and the proposed road on Ganga and the opening of Digha–Sonpur bridge would provide easy access to the people. Digha Bridge Halt connect the Patna Junction, Patliputra Junction and Sonpur station to Digha.  The distance between the Digha-Sonpur bridge and this halt is around 2 km.

Landmarks
 Digha Bridge Halt railway station
 Digha Ghat
 Patliputra Junction railway station
 Tarumitra Ashram

Education
 St. Michael's High School, Patna
St. Paul's High School,Patna
 St. Xavier's College, Patna 
 St. Xavier's College of Education
 Don Bosco Academy
 May Flower School
 St. Dominic Savio’s High School

Popular Place in Digha
Digha Haat (vegetables market)
ITI Campus
WITI (Women's ITI)
Ghats (near JP Setu)

References

Neighbourhoods in Patna